The 34th Legislative Assembly of British Columbia sat from 1987 to 1991. The members were elected in the British Columbia general election held in October 1986. The Social Credit Party led by Bill Vander Zalm formed the government. Vander Zalm resigned in 1991 after he was found to have put himself into a conflict of interest; Rita Johnston then became Premier. The New Democratic Party (NDP) led by Bob Skelly formed the official opposition.

John Douglas Reynolds served as speaker for the assembly until 1989. Stephen Rogers succeeded Reynolds as speaker.

Members of the 34th General Assembly 
The following members were elected to the assembly in 1986:

Notes:

Party standings

By-elections 
By-elections were held to replace members for various reasons:

Notes:

Other changes 
Jack Joseph Kempf left the Social Credit caucus and became an independent on March 30, 1987. He rejoined on June 25, 1990.
 On October 3, 1989 Graham Bruce, Duane Delton Crandall, David Maurice Mercier, and Doug Mowat resigned from the Social Credit caucus to become Independent Social Credit. Crandall rejoined the Social Credit caucus on January 24, 1990. Bruce, Mercier and Mowat rejoined on February 14.
Jack Davis, MLA for North Vancouver-Seymour, died on March 27, 1991.
Robert Arthur Williams, MLA for Vancouver East, resigned his seat on May 7, 1991.
Anthony Brummet, MLA for North Peace River resigned his seat on June 8, 1991.

References 

Political history of British Columbia
Terms of British Columbia Parliaments
1987 establishments in British Columbia
1991 disestablishments in British Columbia
20th century in British Columbia